Carlos Gómez-Díaz (born 24 December 1968) is an Argentine former professional tennis player.

Born and raised in Rafaela, Gómez-Díaz was based in France during his career and reached a best singles world ranking of 198. He featured in the qualifying draws of all four grand slam tournaments and had multiple wins over Gustavo Kuerten on the satellite tour. His only ATP Tour main draw appearance came in doubles at Bucharest in 1994.

Gómez-Díaz, who coached Gilles Müller on the junior circuit, emigrated to Fort Lauderdale, Florida in 2003.

ATP Challenger/ITF Futures finals

Singles: 5 (2–3)

Doubles: 2 (1–1)

References

External links
 
 

1968 births
Living people
Argentine male tennis players
People from Rafaela
Argentine expatriate sportspeople in France
Argentine emigrants to the United States
Sportspeople from Santa Fe Province